Manohara Odelia Pinot (born Manohara Odelia Manz; 28 February 1992) is an Indonesian  model. She once held dual Indonesian and American citizenship. She married Malaysian Kelantanese prince Tengku Muhammad Fakhry Petra on 26 August 2008.

Personal life 
Her mother, Daisy, was previously married to Edy, an Indonesian, followed by American George Manz, who is the biological father of Manohara. The marriage broke up in 1994 and Daisy later married Juergen Reiner Noack-Pinot, a German citizen, whose surname Manohara adopted.

Daisy fled France in 2007 with Manohara and another daughter Dewi after her adopted daughter, Saliha, made a police report against Daisy and Pinot alleging sexual harassment and physical abuse. Daisy was jailed 18 months in absentia while Pinot got four months. She is still a wanted women in France for  "submitting a vulnerable and dependent person to undignified working conditions and assault since 1998".

Manohara gained widespread attention from the Indonesian media in mid April 2009 when her mother, Daisy Fajarina, alleged that Tengku Fakhry, Malaysian Kelantanese prince and Manohara's husband, abducted Manohara. 
 
Manohara met Tengku Fakhry in December 2006 at a dinner held by the Deputy Prime Minister of Malaysia at time, Najib Razak. Despite some problems such as the absence of wali nikah (legal witness) and no legal letter from the Indonesian Embassy, Tengku Fakhry married 16-year-old Manohara in Malaysia on 26 August 2008.

During her stay in Kelantan, Manohara was said to have endured physical and mental abuse from her husband. As a result, she surreptitiously returned to Indonesia via Singapore. Tengku's attempts to woo her back were unsuccessful. He purchased a car for Manohara as a birthday gift in February 2009, and also invited Manohara, her mother and her half-sister on an umrah pilgrimage to Mecca. On 9 March 2009 after the pilgrimage to Mecca, Manohara's mother and Dewi Sri Asih (Manohara's half-sister) were left at an airport in Mecca. Daisy pleaded with the Indonesian government and the National Commission on Human Rights (Komnas HAM) for help to get her abducted daughter back.

The issue gained greater attention when Malaysian Prime Minister Najib Tun Razak dodged questions about the alleged abduction of Manohara by the Malaysian prince as he met Indonesian President Susilo Bambang Yudhoyono in Jakarta on 23 April 2009. The mother of the missing model held a press conference at the National Commission on Violence Against Women in Jakarta. She complained that Malaysian authorities had stopped her going to Malaysia to check on her daughter's condition. The circumstances have been compared to the case of Altantuya Shaariibu. The Indonesian government demanded the Malaysian government explain why an Indonesian woman was denied entry to see her daughter amid claims of abuse committed by her husband of Malaysian royalty.

On Sunday, 31 May 2009 Manohara escaped Kelantan Sultan's authority in Singapore and returned to Indonesia with her mother. Manohara and Kelantan royal family were in Singapore to accompany Sultan of Kelantan as he sought medical treatment there. Daisy Fajarina was in Singapore to meet her daughter, and Manohara called her to tell her the name of hotel where she was staying. When Manohara tried to escape the hotel, Kelantan bodyguards attempted to stop her on the 3rd floor where the Sultan was staying. With assistance from the US Embassy, Manohara reached Changi Airport and finally succeeded in returning to Indonesia with her mother. At a TV press conference on 31 May 2009, Manohara confirmed her mother's allegations that her husband, Tengku Fakhry, had abused her both emotionally and physically. Manohara also stated that she would not return to Kelantan, also expressing her willingness to file for divorce from Tengku Fakhry.

Women's rights activist Ratna Sarumpaet, who previously offered assistance to Manohara, withdrew the offer, citing Manohara and Daisy's lack of determination in pursuing the case. Lawyer O.C. Kaligis, who offered his legal counsel, also withdrew from representing Manohara, citing difficulty in gathering evidence and cooperation. The case was then taken by lawyer Hotman Paris Hutapea.

Indonesia's Foreign Affairs Ministry offered to assist and prepared to file a report to Malaysian police on Manohara's behalf, provided she produced all necessary evidence. Indonesian police also advised Manohara to make a police report in Malaysia with the help of the Foreign Ministry. However, Manohara did not take up the offer, baffling the Indonesian authorities, who  began to suspect something was amiss. They also failed to have made public or given to the Malaysian lawyers a medical report, resulting in their lawyer, Fakrul, applying to discharge himself from the case.

The case involved both Manohara's biological father and stepfather when Daisy informed Indonesian media that Pinot was in Jakarta to lend support to Manohara over recent reports that Manz had sided with Prince Fakhry. Pinot also planned to take Manohara to Europe to further her education in arts and economics. Manohara's biological father George Manz considered it a bad idea, as Pinot is accused of sexual harassment and was threatening to get the US State Department involved because then-17-year-old Manohara is a US citizen.

Saliha returned to Indonesia after more than 10 years to bring her adoptive mother Daisy Fajarina to justice. Indonesian Foreign Minister Hassan Wirajuda confirmed he had received a report from the Consulate-General in Marseilles, France, requesting the Indonesian government assist in getting Daisy to serve the sentence.

In February 2020, Manohara stated in an Instagram story that she had already converted to Christianity, she claimed that she had been a Christian for many years and that it is not anybody's business as it is an extremely private matter between oneself and God.

Legal case
The legal case below is solely based on a lawsuit Fakhry filed within his home state of Malaysia, where Fakhry has much political connections and power. If Manohara had returned to Malaysia or attended the court cases, she ran the threat of being kidnapped from her freedom again or lend credibility to a very biased. It was deemed both intelligent and prudent for her not to attend.

Manohara has challenged prince Fakhry to submit another lawsuit in her home state of Indonesia, where his connections and influence would not lead to such a biased outcome.

In Malaysia courts, Manohara Odelia Pinot has been ordered to return to her husband Tengku Temenggong of Kelantan, Tengku Muhammad Fakhry Sultan Ismail Petra, and pay him the RM1.2mil she borrowed from him after failing to file defence nor attend her court case. If Manohara did not return to her husband, she is deemed to be derhaka (disloyal) and nyusyuz (recalcitrant) and therefore, did not deserve anything from her husband.

The court could not accept the argument that the amount of RM1,112,250 was a gift from Tengku Muhammad Fakhry, based on the non-appearance in court of Manohara throughout the proceedings.

Tengku Fakhry had always maintained that money was not the issue and that it was about his dignity and reputation. He said he was forced to initiate legal proceedings to clear his name as the allegations of physical and sexual abuse were baseless and meant to disparage him in the eyes of the members of the royalty, the government and the public.

Her mother, Daisy Fajarina told that her family was prepared to face the consequences of ignoring the court order including Manohara losing her privileges as Cik Puan Temenggong Kelantan, nor will they pay back the so-called RM1 million debt.

On 20 February 2010, Manohara again became a news item in Malaysia, with her picture kissing Amiel Mohede in the public, while her divorce is still pending.

References

1992 births
Indonesian people of American descent
American people of Indonesian descent
Converts to Christianity from Islam
Indonesian Christians
American Christians
Indonesian former Muslims
American former Muslims
Indonesian female models
Indonesian socialites
American female models
American socialites
Indo people
Living people
People from Jakarta